Stephanie Lynne Niznik (May 20, 1967 – June 23, 2019) was an American film, television, and theatre actress, most famous for her role as Nina Feeney on Everwood.

Early life and career
Niznik intended to become a geneticist before graduating magna cum laude from Duke University majoring in theater and Russian. She then attended the California Institute of the Arts. Besides Everwood, Niznik's television roles include guest roles on Dr. Quinn, Medicine Woman, Profiler, Sliders, JAG, Frasier, Epoch, Star Trek: Enterprise, Traveler, and Diagnosis: Murder, in addition to being a series regular on the mid-1990s action drama Vanishing Son and the 2007 drama Life Is Wild. She also appeared in the films Star Trek: Insurrection and Exit to Eden. After retiring from acting in 2009, Niznik focused on volunteerism.

Death
She died in Encino, California on June 23, 2019, at the age of 52, from chronic liver disease associated with alcoholism.

Filmography

Film

Television

References

External links 
 
 
 

1967 births
2019 deaths
Actresses from Maine
American film actresses
American stage actresses
American television actresses
20th-century American actresses
21st-century American actresses